The 66th Rifle Corps was a corps of the Soviet Red Army. It was part of the 21st Army. It took part in the Great Patriotic War.

Organization 
 61st Rifle Division
 117th Rifle Division
 154th Rifle Division

Commanders 
 Major General Fyodor Sudakov

Reference 

Rifle corps of the Soviet Union